Domingo Andrés (1525, Alcañiz – 1599) was a Spanish humanist, writer and poet.

Publications
 Poema extenso en siete libros acerca de la redención de la humanidad.
 De Jacobo et Joanne Zebedeis fratribus.
 De novissimo juditio.
 De Petro Archi-Apostolo.
 Dos elegías sobre el nacimiento y muerte de Cristo.
 Poecilistichon, sive variorum libri V, 1594.

1525 births
1599 deaths
People from Alcañiz
16th-century Spanish writers
16th-century male writers
Aragonese writers